Zouch  is a hamlet in south west Nottinghamshire, England. It is located between Hathern and Normanton on Soar and is situated by the River Soar, which marks the county boundary with Leicestershire.

Most of the hamlet lies in the civil parish of Sutton Bonington, apart from Zouch Farm which falls within Normanton on Soar parish, and the part in Leicestershire which is in Hathern parish. The nearest town is Loughborough. The A6006 road passes through the hamlet and crosses the Soar on Zouch Bridge (alternatively "County Bridge" as it spans the county border).

There is a pub in the hamlet, the Rose and Crown, with one side of the pub on Main Street and the other on the bank of the Zouch Cut canal. On the far western end of the hamlet, on the Leicestershire side of Zouch Bridge, is the County Bridge Mobile Home Park, where tent pitching is available.

River Soar and Zouch Cut

Zouch is an example of a small canal settlement, though there was a mill there long before the Soar was made navigable (and on some historic maps is denoted as Zouch Mill). Due to the canalisation of the River Soar, involving the construction of the Zouch Cut and several weirs and canals in the vicinity, the hamlet lies on several islands (including the main island, and the much smaller islands of Lower Holme and Upper Holme, which have small houses on them). Canal mooring is a notable feature; on the Leicestershire side of Zouch Bridge, situated on the River Soar, are Zouch Marina and the clubhouse of the Loughborough Boat Club. The Long Whatton Brook joins the Soar between the two.

Etymology
The meaning of the name derives from the Old English term for poor ground.

It is alphabetically last in a list of all the named settlements in Britain.

Gallery

References

Hamlets in Nottinghamshire
Sutton Bonington